The 1978 season of 2. deild karla was the 13th season of third-tier football in Iceland.

Group A

Group B

Group C

Group D

Group E

Group F

Final round

Group A

Group B

Final

Both Selfoss and Magni won promotion to the 1979 1. deild karla.

References
 

2. deild karla seasons
Iceland
Iceland
3